Sumter County High School was a senior high school in York, Alabama. It was a part of the Sumter County School District.

In 1968 the student body was 99.1% white and 90.1% of the teachers were white. Due to white flight, no white students remained by 1970, and about 33% of the teachers were white. Many white students had been placed in Sumter Academy.

The football team had a rivalry with that of Livingston High School. The impetus to merge came because of a declining population - the county had a total of 838 students divided between the two high schools in 2009 - as well as the condition of Sumter County High and budget issues. It merged with Livingston High and became Sumter Central High School in 2011.

References

External links
 

Schools in Sumter County, Alabama
Public high schools in Alabama
2011 disestablishments in Alabama
Educational institutions disestablished in 2011